The Aldabra Group are part of the Outer Islands of the Seychelles, lying in the southwest of the island nation, around  from the capital, Victoria, on Mahé Island.

Population and area
The group contains four islands and atolls. The largest in terms of area is, by far, Aldabra Atoll, with a total land surface area of 155km2, consisting of four main islands (Grand Terre, Malabar, Picard, and Polymnie) and many smaller islets. Aldabra Research Station (on Picard) was established by the Royal Society in 1971 and is Aldabra's only permanent settlement, with a small group of scientists, conservationists, and support staff. There is a small settlement on Assumption, as well as an airstrip. There are small lodges on Astove and Wizard Island, Cosmoledo Atoll. The total land area of the Aldabra Group is 180.03 km².

Islands in the Aldabra group
Aldabra Atoll (a raised atoll with four main and some 40 small islets)
Assumption Island (a single island on a raised reef)
Cosmoledo Atoll (a raised atoll with two main and about 18 smaller islets)
Astove Island (a raised atoll with just one island)

References

External links
Indian Ocean Pilot

Outer Islands (Seychelles)
Archipelagoes of Seychelles